Tokyo Chinese School (TCS) is a Chinese International school in  (五番町), Chiyoda, Tokyo, Japan. The Ministry of Education, Culture, Sports, Science and Technology (MEXT) accredits the school.

Originally established in 1929 as an elementary school for Overseas Chinese, its operation now follows the education system of the Republic of China (Taiwan), and provides education for students ageing between 7 and 18.

History

Historically the school was located in Yotsuya.
Around 1984 the school built an office building that was rented to Japanese companies, generating revenue for the school.

In a 2008 The Japan Times article Liu Chien Cheng, the head of the school, said that she saw an increase in applications "over the past two or three years." She did not state specific numbers.

Campus
As of 1989 the school had audiovisual language education, cooking, and music facilities. A renovation of the school building, funded by loans from a Japanese bank, occurred in 1984. Cecilia Chang of Taiwan Today wrote in 1989 that "The newly refurbished school building has facilities far superior to most similar institutions in Taiwan."

Curriculum
As of 1989 in most classes the school uses Taiwanese textbooks. In arithmetic and natural science the school does not use Taiwanese textbooks. The school has social etiquette classes. The school has Mandarin, Japanese, and English classes, and Cecilia Chang stated that the school had an emphasis on language education.

Student body
As of 2003 it had 352 students. As of 2008 most students are from Taiwan or China, and about 33% of the students are from Japan. As of the same year 80% of the students who graduate from the school attend universities and colleges. Most students go to Japanese universities. Some students go to Taiwanese universities and some go to universities in other countries. As of 1989 several Taiwanese students have parents who are taking graduate courses at Japanese universities; they will return to Taiwan once the parents finish their studies.

Teacher demographics
Teachers at this school have higher salaries compared to the salaries found in most Chinese schools outside of Greater China. Most teachers have Master of Arts degrees as of 1989. Some teachers have PhDs as of the same year.

Notable alumni

Go players
Cho U
Xie Yimin
Rin Kaiho
Ō Rissei

Others
Judy Ongg, singer
Chen Kenichi, chef
Yinling, model
Annie Yi, singer

See also

 Chinese people in Japan

Japanese international schools in Taiwan, Republic of China:
 Taipei Japanese School
 Kaohsiung Japanese School
 Taichung Japanese School

References

Further reading

 Xu Hui (徐 輝). "A comparative study of Chinese and Indian school in Japan : Focus on the "Tokyo chuka school" and "GIIS"" (在日華僑学校と印僑学校に関する比較考察 : 東京中華学校とGIISを中心に; Archive). 大東アジア学論集 (14), 44-63, 2014-03. 大東文化大学大学院アジア地域研究科. See profile and profile #2 at CiNii. see profile at Daito Bunka University Repository (大東文化大学機関リポジトリ). English abstract available.

Not available online:
 張 建国. "Looking at the Future of Japanese Education System : From the Present Situation of Tokyo Chinese School" (東京中華学校の現状から日本の教育の明日を考える (特集 華人とは誰か : 教育とアイデンティティ)). 華僑華人研究 (8), 49-54, 2011. 日本華僑華人学会. See profile at CiNii.

External links
 Tokyo Chinese School /

International schools in Tokyo
Taiwanese international schools in Japan
Educational institutions established in 1929
Elementary schools in Japan
1929 establishments in Japan
Buildings and structures in Chiyoda, Tokyo